David Povall (born June 21, 1947, in San Antonio, Texas) is an American actor. After acting in many Mexican and American films, known as David Estuardo, he also works as a voice actor.

Filmography

Live-action 
The Arrival - Additional voices
Counting Days - Rev. John Santos
The Ring - Girl's father

Anime
The Castle of Cagliostro - Inspector Koichi Zenigata (MGM version)
The Professional: Golgo 13 - F. Garvin
3x3 Eyes - Benares; Demon
Wicked City - Hodgkins (USA dub)
Dirty Pair: Flight 005 Conspiracy - Additional voices
Crying Freeman Volume 3: Shades of Death Part 2 - Goken Ishida; Abductor
Tales of the Wolf - Inspector Koichi Zenigata
Megazone 23 - Newscaster; Sensor operator
Lupin III: The Mystery of Mamo - Inspector Koichi Zenigata

TV Series
Phantom 2040 - Additional voices
Team Knight Rider - Computer Guy
The Ex-List - Mr. Crane

Video games 
Total Annihilation: Kingdoms - Unit #5 (voice)

References

External links

1947 births
Living people
American male voice actors
Place of birth missing (living people)